Dascillus is a genus of soft-bodied plant beetles in the family Dascillidae. There are more than 20 described species in Dascillus.

Species
These 24 species belong to the genus Dascillus:

 Dascillus cervinus (Linnaeus, 1758)
 Dascillus chifengi Jin, Ślipiński & Pang, 2013
 Dascillus congruus Pascoe, 1860
 Dascillus corporaali Pic, 1923
 Dascillus davidsoni (LeConte, 1859)
 Dascillus elongatus Zhang, 1989
 Dascillus flatus Zhang, 1989
 Dascillus formosanus Jin, Ślipiński & Pang, 2013
 Dascillus lanceus Jin, Ślipiński & Pang, 2013
 Dascillus latahensis Lewis, 1973
 Dascillus lateralis Megerle
 Dascillus levigatus Li, Ślipiński & Jin, 2017
 Dascillus liangshanensis
 Dascillus lithographicus Wickham, 1911
 Dascillus malachiticus Knoch
 Dascillus musculus Zhang & al., 1994
 Dascillus plumbeus (Horn, 1880)
 Dascillus relictus Zhang, 1989
 Dascillus shandongianus Zhang, 1989
 Dascillus sicanus Fairmaire, 1861
 Dascillus smaragdinus Megerle
 Dascillus sparsus Dahl
 Dascillus subundatus Peiroleri
 † Dascyllus lithographicus Wickham, 1911

References

Further reading

External links

 

Polyphaga
Articles created by Qbugbot